The 2020 season was the Baltimore Ravens' 25th in the National Football League and their 13th under head coach John Harbaugh. They failed to improve upon their franchise-best 14–2 regular season and were denied their third consecutive AFC North title following a loss to the Pittsburgh Steelers in Week 12 after 18 of their players contracted COVID-19. Despite this, as well as a 6–5 start, the Ravens won their five remaining games to finish 11–5 and after a win over the Cincinnati Bengals in Week 17, clinched their third consecutive playoff berth.  The Ravens rushed for 3,071 yds during the regular season, best in the NFL for the second consecutive season.

In the playoffs, the Ravens defeated the Tennessee Titans 20–13 in the Wild Card round, avenging their Divisional round loss to the Titans from the previous year. The win marked quarterback Lamar Jackson's first career playoff victory and was the Ravens' first win in the playoffs since beating the Pittsburgh Steelers in the 2014–15 NFL playoffs. However, their season would end in the Divisional round for the second straight year, this time to the Buffalo Bills by a score of 3–17.

Offseason

Players added

Players lost

2020 NFL Draft 

Trades:
 The Ravens traded a seventh-round selection to the Green Bay Packers in exchange for running back Ty Montgomery.
 The Ravens traded guard Alex Lewis to the New York Jets in exchange for a conditional seventh-round selection.
 The Ravens traded kicker/punter Kaare Vedvik to the Minnesota Vikings in exchange for Minnesota's fifth-round selection.
 The Ravens traded their sixth-round selection and offensive lineman Jermaine Eluemunor to the New England Patriots in exchange for New England's fourth-round selection.
 The Ravens traded their fourth-round selection and tight end Hayden Hurst to the Atlanta Falcons in exchange for Atlanta's second-round and fifth-round selections (55th and 157th overall).
 The Ravens traded the fifth-round selection they received from the Atlanta Falcons to the Jacksonville Jaguars in exchange for defensive end Calais Campbell.
 The Ravens traded their second- and fourth-round selections (60th and 129th overall) to the New England Patriots in exchange for New England's third-round selections (71st and 98th overall).
 The Ravens traded their seventh-round selection (225th overall) and the 2021 fifth-round pick they acquired from the Pittsburgh Steelers to the Minnesota Vikings in exchange for Minnesota's sixth- and seventh-round selections (201st and 219th overall).

Undrafted free agents

Staff

Final roster

Preseason 
The Ravens' preseason schedule was announced on May 7, but was later canceled due to the COVID-19 pandemic.

Regular season

Schedule 
The Ravens' 2020 schedule was announced on May 7.

Note: Intra-division opponents are in bold text.

Game summaries

Week 1: Baltimore Ravens 38, Cleveland Browns 6 

Lamar Jackson went 20 for 25 for 275 yards and 3 touchdowns and was named AFC Offensive Player of the Week. With the 38–6 win, the Ravens became the first team in NFL history to win three consecutive season openers by 30 points or more and the only NFL team to have scored at least 20 points in their last 24 regular season games.

Week 2: Baltimore Ravens 33, Houston Texans 16 

The Ravens defense dominated the Texans, sacking Watson 4 times, with one interception and one fumble returned for a touchdown. Houston was limited to 51 yards total rushing, compared to the Ravens' 230 yards.

Week 3: Kansas City Chiefs 34, Baltimore Ravens 20 

This loss snapped a 14-game regular season winning streak dating back to week 4 of last season; it also dropped Jackson's record as a starter to 0–3 against Patrick Mahomes and the Chiefs. It was the Ravens' only multi-score loss of the season.

Week 4: Baltimore Ravens 31, Washington Football Team 17 

Lamar Jackson threw for 193 yards and 2 touchdowns, rushed for 52 yards and 1 touchdown making him the fastest player in NFL history to reach 5,000 yards passing and 2,000 yards rushing.

Week 5: Baltimore Ravens 27, Cincinnati Bengals 3 

Baltimore's defense dominated the matchup, sacking rookie Bengals' QB Joe Burrow seven times and allowing just 3 points in a blowout win. It also was the Ravens' fourth straight win over the Bengals.

Week 6: Baltimore Ravens 30, Philadelphia Eagles 28 

After taking a 17–0 halftime lead, Baltimore survived a furious second-half rally from the Eagles, stopping a two-point conversion, recovering the ensuing onside kick, and getting a first down in the final two minutes to earn their third straight win, and their first ever road win over the Eagles.

Week 8: Pittsburgh Steelers 28, Baltimore Ravens 24 

With the loss, the Ravens fell to 5–2 and lost to the Steelers for the first time since week 9 of the 2018 season. It was also Jackson's first career loss to the Steelers since taking over as starter.

Week 9: Baltimore Ravens 24, Indianapolis Colts 10 

After losing a tough game at home to the Steelers the previous week, the Ravens looked to bounce back against the Colts. The Ravens offense was limited to 55 yards of total offense in the first half, the fewest since Lamar Jackson took over as the Ravens quarterback in 2018, and trailed the Colts 10–7 going into halftime. In the second half, the Ravens scored 17 unanswered points while the defense forced a turnover, a punt and 2 turnover on downs against the Colts. With the win, the Ravens improved to 6–2. This was also the franchise's first ever road win in Indianapolis.

Week 10: New England Patriots 23, Baltimore Ravens 17 

With the upset loss, the Ravens dropped to 6-3 and ended their record streak for most consecutive regular season games scoring at least 20 points, at 31.

Week 11: Tennessee Titans 30, Baltimore Ravens 24 (OT)

Week 12: Pittsburgh Steelers 19, Baltimore Ravens 14 

Although it was originally scheduled for Thanksgiving night, a COVID-19 outbreak with the Ravens organization caused the game to be postpone three times. 18 players were out for the Ravens, including QB Lamar Jackson, RBs Mark Ingram II and J. K. Dobbins, FB Patrick Ricard, TE Mark Andrews, WR Willie Snead, DE Calais Campbell, and NT Brandon Williams. With the loss, the Ravens fell to 6–5 and were eliminated from AFC North contention.  They would be swept by the Steelers for the first time since 2017.

Week 13: Baltimore Ravens 34, Dallas Cowboys 17 

Most of the Ravens starters, including Lamar Jackson, returned as Ravens defeated the Cowboys. The Ravens as a team rushed for 294 yards and two touchdowns, while Jackson added 107 yards passing and two more touchdowns. The game would have also pitted WR Dez Bryant against his former team, but a positive COVID-19 test right before the game caused him to be held out.

Week 14: Baltimore Ravens 47, Cleveland Browns 42 

In the highest scoring game in the history of the Browns–Ravens rivalry, as well as in the 2020 NFL season, Lamar Jackson rushed for two touchdowns but left the game for a short time in the fourth quarter with "cramps", allowing the Browns to rally from a 34–20 deficit to take a 35–34 lead. Backup Trace McSorley was forced into the game as a result, but left with a knee injury at the two-minute warning. Jackson then came back out and threw a 44-yard touchdown pass to Marquise Brown on 4th and 5, putting the Ravens back in front, 42–35. After Cleveland quickly drove down the field and tied the game, Jackson led the Ravens on a short drive that got them into field goal range, where Justin Tucker booted a 55-yard field goal with two seconds remaining to win the game for the Ravens. A safety on the Browns' final play capped the wild finish and brought the final score to 47–42.

Week 15: Baltimore Ravens 40, Jacksonville Jaguars 14 

After a thrilling shootout win the week prior, the Ravens routed the Jaguars in Week 14 to keep their playoff hopes alive. Lamar Jackson threw for 243 yards with three touchdowns and an interception while also adding 35 yards and a touchdown on the ground. Jackson second touchdown throw was an 11-yard pass to WR Dez Bryant late in the second quarter. It was Bryant's first touchdown since Week 14 of the 2017 season. It also marked the first time since Week 13 of that same season that he along with Larry Fitzgerald and Antonio Brown all caught touchdown passes in the same week.

Week 16: Baltimore Ravens 27, New York Giants 13 

The Ravens won their fourth straight game behind another dominant running performance as the team rushed for 249 yards. Their win coupled with critical losses by the Cleveland Browns against the New York Jets and the Indianapolis Colts against the division rival Pittsburgh Steelers put the Ravens in a "win and in" playoff scenario against the Cincinnati Bengals in Week 17.

Week 17: Baltimore Ravens 38, Cincinnati Bengals 3 

Needing a win to clinch a playoff berth, the Ravens rushed for a club-record 404 yards — the fourth team since 1950 to rush for more than 400 in a single game — and Lamar Jackson became the first quarterback to rush for over 1,000 yards in more than one season as the Ravens routed the Bengals for their fifth straight victory. The Week 17 win secured the Ravens' third straight playoff run under Jackson.

Standings

Division

Conference

Postseason

Schedule

Game summaries

AFC Wild Card Playoffs: Baltimore Ravens 20, Tennessee Titans 13 

The Ravens achieved their first playoff win since 2014 and the first for quarterback Lamar Jackson, outscoring the Titans 20–3 after trailing 10–0. It was also Jackson's first win in a game in which he trailed by two scores. In the five playoff games between the two teams, the home team has yet to win.

AFC Divisional Playoffs: Buffalo Bills 17, Baltimore Ravens 3 

The Ravens' season ended with a game in which they scored the fewest points since John Harbaugh became head coach.   Lamar Jackson was intercepted in the end zone for a pick-six, then was later knocked out of the game with a concussion.

Individual awards

Notes

References

External links 
 

Baltimore
Baltimore Ravens seasons
Baltimore Ravens
2020s in Baltimore